Potts Plantation is a historic plantation complex and national historic district located near Cornelius, Mecklenburg County, North Carolina. The district encompasses 11 contributing buildings, 12 contributing sites, and 4 contributing structures in rural Mecklenburg County. The plantation seat was built in 1811, and consists of a two-story, three bay, weatherboarded log house on a low brick foundation with flanking one-story wings added in 1947. The house has Federal, Late Victorian, and Colonial Revival style design elements. Associated with the plantation seat are the contributing smokehouse (c. 1811 – 1820), dependency, poultry house (c. 1920 – 1940), double-pen log barn work area, and corn crib (c. 1900 – 1920). Other notable contributing resources are the Slave Cemetery, five tenant complexes, the Smith Cottage Complex (c. 1891 – 1961), Smith Cottage (c. 1891), and Potts Cemetery (1946). The Potts Plantation has been the property of the Potts family since 1753.

It was listed on the National Register of Historic Places in 1998.

References

Plantation houses in North Carolina
Farms on the National Register of Historic Places in North Carolina
Historic districts on the National Register of Historic Places in North Carolina
Federal architecture in North Carolina
Victorian architecture in North Carolina
Colonial Revival architecture in North Carolina
Houses completed in 1811
Houses in Charlotte, North Carolina
National Register of Historic Places in Mecklenburg County, North Carolina